Gerald G. Bamman (born September 18, 1941) is an American actor and playwright. He is best known for playing Uncle Frank in the films Home Alone (1990) and Home Alone 2: Lost in New York (1992), and has also guest starred in several television series.

Early and personal life
Bamman was born on September 18, 1941 in Independence, Kansas, the son of Mary M. (née Farrell) and Harry W. Bamman. He studied at St. Francis de Sales School and later graduated from New York University with a MFA degree.

Bamman was married to director Emily Mann on August 12, 1981, but is now divorced from her. They have one son, Nicholas, born in 1983.

Career
Bamman appeared in the Michael J. Fox film The Secret of My Success (1987) and also appeared with Fran Brill and Alyssa Milano in Old Enough (1984). He had a minor role in Cocktail (1988) before portraying his most notable character, Uncle Frank McCallister in Home Alone and Home Alone 2: Lost in New York in 1990 and 1992, respectively. Bamman improvised the scene in Home Alone 2 where Frank is in the shower and Kevin (Macaulay Culkin) walks in on him. "I love the shower scene, even though I don’t think it was the funniest scene in the film," he told the Metro in 2020. "But it was great fun to shoot, because I really had fun padding it out. [The director] Chris [Columbus] started to give me directions and choreograph the scene and I said, 'Wait, wait, just let me show you what I've done, and what I have in mind'. And he bought it."

Also in 1992, Bamman appeared briefly as Kevin Costner's former colleague Ray Court in the box office smash The Bodyguard. Bamman appeared as defense attorney Stan Gillum in several episodes of Law & Order and Law & Order SVU. Bamman was also in the first season episode "The Blue Wall" playing Lt. Kennedy of Internal Affairs. Bamman co-starred in Runaway Jury as the blind jury foreman Herman Grimes. Bamman also played Dr. Judalon in the 1992 film Lorenzo's Oil.

Filmography

References

External links

1941 births
Living people
American male film actors
American male television actors
Male actors from Pennsylvania
People from Independence, Kansas
Male actors from Kansas
20th-century American male actors
21st-century American male actors